Giorgio Sereni (3 September 1935 — 6 October 2010) was an Italian football defender and later manager.

References

1935 births
2010 deaths
Footballers from Brescia
Italian footballers
A.C. Reggiana 1919 players
Palermo F.C. players
Calcio Padova players
Serie A players
Association football defenders
Italian football managers
Venezia F.C. managers

Parma Calcio 1913 managers
U.S. Catanzaro 1929 managers
Rimini F.C. 1912 managers
Calcio Foggia 1920 managers
Calcio Padova managers
U.S. Salernitana 1919 managers
A.C.N. Siena 1904 managers
A.C. Monopoli managers